Eurosport 2 is a French sports television network. It is a sister channel to Eurosport 1, which is a division of the Eurosport Network and a unit of Warner Bros. Discovery. Several different versions of the channel exist across Europe, where television rights for sport differ. The Eurosport 2 channel had an audience of 87 million viewers in 2019, an increase in size of one million.

Launch

Eurosport 2 launched on 10 January 2005. It is currently available in 50 million homes and 47 countries, broadcasting in 18 different languages English, Swedish, French, Italian, German, Greek, Hungarian, Russian, Bulgarian, Polish,  Portuguese,  Romanian, Serbian, Turkish, Czech, Dutch, Spanish and Danish.

On 9 March 2022, Discovery Inc. closed Eurosport 2 in Russia due to Russia's invasion of Ukraine.

Programming
Eurosport 2 considers itself "the new generation sports channel", and is dedicated to team sports and in particular 'alternative' and niche sports including European basketball, National Lacrosse League, Twenty20 cricket, AFL Aussie Rules, surfing and the Handball Champions League, amongst others.

On 2 July 2010, the Arena Football League announced that Eurosport 2 would show matches that the NFL Network broadcast in the United States on a tape delay for the rest of the season, as well as coverage of ArenaBowl XXIII. The deal also includes rights for the entire 2011 season to be broadcast on the channel.

Eurosport 2 HD

Eurosport 2 HD, a high-definition version of the channel is also available. In central and northern Europe, it carries some exclusive programming such as Bundesliga football from Germany, WWE wrestling shows and live Australian Rules Football matches, which are not available on other versions due to local networks holding the rights.

Eurosport DK
Eurosport DK was a Danish television channel owned by Discovery Networks Northern Europe. The channel replaced Canal 8 Sport and Eurosport 2 in Denmark on 1 July 2015.

On 28 May 2015, Discovery Networks Northern Europe announced that they would merge Canal 8 Sport and Eurosport 2 into Eurosport DK in Denmark, broadcasting football from Danish Superliga, the Bundesliga, Major League Soccer, Capital One Cup, UEFA Euro 2016 qualifying, Tennis from ATP Tour, WTA Tour and 3 Grand Slams, Cycling from UCI World Tour, Winter sport, Motorsports.

On 15 February 2016, the channel was replaced by Eurosport 2.

Eurosport Norway
Eurosport Norway is a Norwegian television channel that replaced Eurosport 2 since 3 September 2015.
. It is owned by Discovery Networks Norway and broadcasts Norwegian eliteserien and other Eurosport programming.

English Language Bundesliga commentators

Availability

Terrestrial
 Lattelecom (Latvia): Channel 51

Satellite
 Allente (Denmark, Finland, Norway, Sweden):
 A1 Bulgaria (Bulgaria): Channel 145
 Antik Sat (Czech Republic): Channel 43
 Bulsatcom (Bulgaria): Channel 19
 Canal+: Channel 64
 Canal+ Caraïbes (Overseas France): Channel 125
 DigitAlb (Albania): Channel
 Digiturk (Turkey): Channel 72
 Direct One (Hungary): Channel 123
 D-Smart (Turkey): Channel 76
 Focus Sat (Czech Republic): Channel 68
 Fotelka (Czech Republic): Channel 102
 Home 3 (Estonia, Lithuania, Latvia)
 MEO (Portugl): Channel 38
 Movistar Plus+ (Spain): Channel 67 (SD)
 M:Sat TV (Serbia): Channel 40
 NOS (Portugl): Channel 131
 Nova (Greece): Channel 113
 Neosat (Bulgaria):
 Orange Polska (Poland): Channel 112
 Platforma Canal+ (Poland): Channel 114
 Polsat Box (Poland): Channel 15
 Sky (UK & Ireland): Channel 411
 Sky Italia (Italy): 211
 Telly (Czech Republic): Channel 30
 Tivibu (Turkey): Channel 72
 Telemach (Slovenia):
 Total TV (Bosnia and Herzegovina): Channel 181
 Total TV (Croatia): Channel 121
 Total TV (North Macedonia): Channel 171
 Total TV (Serbia): Channel 171
 T-Home (Hungary): Channel 49
 Viasat Ukraine (Ukraine):
 Vivacom (Bulgaria): Channel 215 (SD)

Cable
 Caiway (Netherlands): Channel 137 (HD)
 Com Hem (Sweden): Channel 103
 DELTA (Netherlands): Channel 151 (SD)
 Global Destiny (Philippines): Channel 36
 Digi TV (Hungary): Channel 37
 Hot (Israel): Channel 59
 Kabel Deutschland (Germany): Channel 373
 Kabel Noord (Netherlands): Channel 301 (HD)
 Lattelecom (Latvia): Channel 402
 Naxoo (Switzerland): Channel 81
 Numericable (France): Channel 152
 RCS&RDS (Romania): Channel 30
 Serbia Broadband: Channel 268 and Channel 137 (HD)
 Telenet (Flanders): Channel 211
 T-Home (Hungary): Channel 38
 T-Home Digital (Hungary): Channel S38
 UPC Digital (Hungary): Channel 46
 UPC Poland (Poland): Channel 564
 UPC Poland: Channel 566 and Channel 567 (HD)
 UPC Romania: Channel 211
 Virgin Media Ireland: Channel 425 and Channel 426 (HD)
 Virgin Media (UK): Channel 522 (HD)
 Vodafone TV (Spain): Channel 251 (HD)
 WightFibre (UK): Channel 88
 Ziggo (Netherlands): Channel 411 (HD)
 ZON TV (Portugal): Channel 28 (no coverage in Mirandela)
 ArtMotion (Kosovo): Channel 81
 IPKO (Kosovo) Channel 217
DigitAlb (Albania) 
 Kujtesa (Kosovo) Channel 145

IPTV
 Belgacom TV (Belgium): Channel 74 (Dutch) and Channel 85 (French)
 BT TV (United Kingdom): Channel 413 and Channel 436 (HD)
 eir Vision (Ireland): Channel 414 and Channel 428 (HD)
 KPN (Netherlands): Channel 36 (HD)
 MEO (Portugal): Channel 38
 MojaTV (Bosnia and Herzegovina): Channel 35
 Movistar+ (Spain): Channel 62 (HD, SD)
 On Telecoms (Greece): Channel 47
 Open IPTV (Serbia): Channel 562
 Orange TV (Spain): Channel 101 (HD)
 Tele2 (Netherlands): Channel 208 (SD)
 T-Home (Hungary): Channel
 T-Mobile (Netherlands): Channel 132 (HD)
 Tivibu (Turkey): Channel 86
 Vodafone Tv Net Voz (Portugal): Channel 27
 iNES (Romania): Channel

Online
 eurosport.com (Europe and wider region): Watch live, subscription required
 Virgin TV Anywhere (UK): Watch live
 Ziggo GO (Netherlands): ZiggoGO.tv
 DAZN (Italy)

External links
 Official Site
 Danish Presentation

References

Eurosport
2005 establishments in France
Television channels and stations established in 2005
Sports television channels in the United Kingdom
Sports television in Denmark
Sports television networks in France
Sports television in Germany
Sports television in Hungary
Sports television in Italy
Sports television in Poland
Sports television in Spain
Sports television in Portugal
Sports television in North Macedonia
Sports mass media in Italy
Television channels in Italy
Television stations in France
Television stations in Germany
Television channels in the Netherlands
Television channels in Flanders
Television channels in Belgium
Television channels in Bulgaria
Television stations in Denmark
Television channels in Poland
Television stations in Romania
Defunct television channels in Russia
Television channels in North Macedonia
Sports television in Russia
Television stations in Turkey